Nationality words link to articles with information on the nation's poetry or literature (for instance, Irish or France).

Events
 December 4 – John of the Cross (Juan de Yepes) is imprisoned in Toledo, Spain. During his imprisonment he composes his Spiritual Canticle (Cántico Espiritual).

Works published

Great Britain
 Nicholas Breton:
 The Works of a Young Wit
 A Flourish upon Fancy
 John Grange, The Golden Aphroditis, poetry and prose

Other
 Philippe Desportes, an edition of his works; France
 Guillaume Du Bartas, La Semaine, ou Création du Monde, France
 Eoghan O'Duffy, tr. by John O'Daly (1864), The Apostasy of Myler Magrath, Archbishop of Cashel, Cashel, County Tipperary. Composed as Irish bardic poetry in 1577.

Births
 March – George Sandys (died 1644), English  traveller, colonist and poet
 November 10 – Jacob Cats (died 1660), Dutch poet

Deaths
 March 6 – Rémy Belleau (born 1528), French poet and member of La Pléiade
 April 21 – Girolamo Parabosco (born c. 1524), Italian poet and musician
 August 12 – Sir Thomas Smith (born 1513), English scholar, diplomat and poet
 October 7 – George Gascoigne (born c. 1535), English poet who died while a guest at George Whetstone's family manor of Walcot at Barnack, near Stamford, Lincolnshire; Whetstone commemorated his friend in a long elegy.
 Also:
 Annibale Cruceio (born 1509), Italian, Latin-language poet

See also

 Poetry
 16th century in poetry
 16th century in literature
 Dutch Renaissance and Golden Age literature
 Elizabethan literature
 French Renaissance literature
 Renaissance literature
 Spanish Renaissance literature

Notes

16th-century poetry
Poetry